Lola Maja (born Omolola Maja; 26 January 1978), also known as Lola Maja-Okojevoh, is a Nigerian make-up artist; her specialties include special effects, eyebrows and eyelashes. She is the founder and Chief Executive Officer of "Sacred Beauty" & "The SFX Store". She is known for working on several major fashion events and on major films such as The Figurine and October 1, as well as several music videos. She has done make-up for celebrities, including Genevieve Nnaji and Tiwa Savage. She has also worked with major fashion magazines, such as Style Mania and FAB, as well as models like Iman and Tyson Beckford. In 2015, she won the "Best Make-up" Africa Magic Viewers Choice Award for October 1.

Background and early life
Maja was born in Nigeria, to a father of Yoruba descent and a mother with Itsekiri, Lebanese, Italian, Indian and Scottish ancestry. She is a granddaughter of the Nigerian founding father Akinola Maja and his wife Comfort, who was herself the Erelu Kuti of Lagos. At the age of 2, she and her family moved to the United Kingdom where she grew up. She moved back to Nigeria in 2010, after she got married.

Career
Maja started working as a makeup artist when she was 14, whilst she was still in high school, and into college. At 18, she had to make a choice: either continue her degree or leave and take the role as makeup artist of the original team to launch Iman Cosmetics at their flagship counter in London. She followed her heart and launched Iman Cosmetics in 1997. She launched her own lashes range "Sacred Lashes" in 2010 and The SFX Store in 2016.

Maja went back to school to get a formal qualifications in "Beauty Therapy". She graduated from the London College of Beauty Therapy, then went on to St Mary's University College, Twickenham. Thereafter, she obtained a Teaching Diploma, after which she launched a Beauty Academy in 2013.

Maja has a wide range in her make-up portfolio, from special effects to bridal, from beauty to creative fashion. She worked on the music video of My Darlin by Tiwa Savage, whom she transformed into an old lady in the video. She did Genevieve Nnaji's make up for the photoshoot of her clothing line St.Genevieve. She also worked as a Beauty Editor for major fashion magazines like Style Mania, FAB and Noir. Her make-up work has appeared in popular magazines, like: TW, Genevieve Magazine, True Love, Elan, Black Hair & Beauty, Colors, Pride, Sideview, and Trendsetter. She has worked with supermodels like Iman and Tyson Beckford. Other celebrities she has worked with include: Alek Wek, Ernie Hudson, Joe Estevez, Joe, Dru Hill, Ojy Okpe, Fifi Ejindu, Genevieve Nnaji, Omotola Jalade, Rita Dominic, Kate Henshaw, Tiwa Savage, Omawumi, Waje, Toolz, Toke Makinwa, Eku Edewor.

Maja did the make-up for five of Kunle Afolayan's films, including The Figurine (2009) and October 1 (2014); the latter for which she won the 2015 Africa Magic Viewers Choice Award for "Best Make-up". She was also the make-up artist for the third and fourth season of the television drama series Shuga. Maja has also worked on several music videos, such as: Wizkid's "Tease Me", Banky W’s "Lagos Party", Omawumi’s "Today Na Today" and Dr SID’s "Something About You". Maja is also a regular guest on television lifestyle shows & radio, where she talks about beauty, fashion and makeup advice while commenting on the latest trends in fashion.

Personal life
Maja met her husband, Tonio Okojevoh, at a cousin's wedding whilst she was still engaged to another; an engagement which didn't work out. She became friends with Tonio and after six years, he proposed, without prior dating. Maja has stated that she and her husband were celibate before they got married, a decision that her husband initiated, as his promise to God. Tonio and Lola got married in 2010; together, they have two children, Tega and Tallulah, born in 2011 and 2013 respectively. She once shared that whilst she was in labour with her first child, listening to "Bumper to Bumper" by Wande Coal helped to ease her labour pains. She has also made it known that she won't be having anymore children.

Filmography

Film and television

Awards and nominations

References

External links

1978 births
Living people
Nigerian make-up artists
Yoruba women filmmakers
Nigerian Christians
Itsekiri people
Nigerian fashion businesspeople
Yoruba women in business
21st-century Nigerian businesswomen
21st-century Nigerian businesspeople
Nigerian women company founders
Nigerian cosmetics businesspeople
Alumni of St Mary's College, Durham
Nigerian businesspeople in retailing